The 1985 World Fencing Championships were held in Barcelona, Catalonia, Spain.

Medal table

Medal summary

Men's events

Women's events

References

FIE Results

World Fencing Championships
F
1985
Fen
1980s in Barcelona
Sports competitions in Barcelona
1985 in fencing
1985 in Catalonia